Asota comorana is a moth of the family Erebidae first described by Per Olof Christopher Aurivillius in 1909. It is found on the Comores.

References

Asota (moth)
Moths of the Comoros
Moths of Africa
Moths described in 1909